Cayuga Generating Station is an electricity-generating facility, located in Eugene Township, Vermillion County, near Cayuga, Indiana. Its almost identical, coal-fired Units 1 and 2 were launched into service in 1970 and 1972, and have a combined name-plate generating capacity of 1,062 MWe. Unit 4 (121 MWe, launched in 1993) is powered by natural gas, but can also be switched to oil. There are also four minor oil-fired units (numbered 31–34, 2.6 MWe each) of internal combustion design. The facility is entirely owned by Duke Energy.

Environmental impact
In 2006, the plant emitted 86,174 tons of sulfur dioxide into the air. Its  emission rate per unit of electricity produced was 26.68 lb/MWh in 2006, ranking 2nd worst in the United States. In 2008, Cayuga Station's flue-gas desulfurization (FGD) for Units 1 and 2 went online reducing the station's  emissions by approximately 95%.

See also

 List of power stations in Indiana

References

Energy infrastructure completed in 1970
Energy infrastructure completed in 1972
Energy infrastructure completed in 1993
Buildings and structures in Vermillion County, Indiana
Coal-fired power stations in Indiana
Duke Energy